Rachel Hope Mitchell (born 1967) is an American attorney serving as the County Attorney for Maricopa County, Arizona since April 2022.  She was appointed to the position following the resignation of Allister Adel and won the 2022 special election. In 2019, she briefly served as the acting County Attorney after the appointment of Bill Montgomery to the Arizona Supreme Court. Previously, she was the Chief Deputy County Attorney, and chief of the Special Victims Division.

In 2018, Mitchell rose to national prominence when she was requested by the Senate Judiciary Committee to serve as Nomination Investigative Counsel and question both Christine Blasey Ford and Brett Kavanaugh on September 27, 2018 during Kavanaugh's widely publicized confirmation hearings for Associate Justice of the Supreme Court of the United States.

Early life and education 
Mitchell is a first-generation Arizonan whose father grew up on a farm in Arkansas and whose mother grew up in a small town in Pennsylvania. Mitchell attended Arizona State University in 1985, took a course at Phoenix College in the summer of 1987, and got a Bachelor of Science degree from Grand Canyon College, now known as Grand Canyon University. She earned her J.D. degree in 1992 from the ASU's College of Law.

Mitchell worked at the Arizona Capitol Times newspaper in the late 1980s. She interviewed candidates running for elected office and wrote summaries of decisions by the courts. Mitchell later worked as adjunct faculty at Grand Canyon University, where she taught a three-credit course on the court system.

Legal career 
Mitchell has been a current, registered member of the Arizona bar since 1993. In 2003, Mitchell was recognized by Arizona Governor Janet Napolitano as "Outstanding Arizona Sexual Assault Prosecutor of the Year." She was promoted to the Maricopa County prosecutor's office sex crimes division chief by newly elected county attorney Andrew Thomas in 2004 to replace previous chief Cindi Nannetti.

Mitchell spent 12 years in charge of the sex-crimes bureau, which prosecutes crimes including adult sexual assault and child molestation.

In 2014, a commission recommended her as a possible judicial candidate in Arizona. Mitchell has overseen and assisted in prosecuting some high-profile sexual assault cases in Arizona, including ones against churches, youth camps, law enforcement, and members of clergy. Her most prominent case was the 2005 conviction of Rev. Paul LeBrun. In her position in Maricopa County, she has advocated strengthening sex assault laws in the state and has pushed for changes in the courtroom to comfort victims testifying in abuse cases. Mitchell made headlines in 2016 after allowing a golden retriever mix named Sam to assist children when they were testifying about traumatic episodes.

Mitchell's name appears on a list of Arizona "lobbyist updates" for the week of March 26, 2018.

Senate Judiciary Committee hearings (2018) 

In September 2018, Mitchell took a leave of absence from the Maricopa County Attorney's Office in order to serve as Investigative Counsel for the Senate Judiciary Committee, during the confirmation hearings of Brett Kavanaugh for Associate Justice of the Supreme Court of the United States. She participated in the September 27, 2018 hearings of Christine Blasey Ford and Kavanaugh, concerning Ford's allegations of sexual assault towards Kavanaugh. Mitchell was brought in by the Republican senators in the Committee, and questioned Ford and Kavanaugh. The Committee's Democratic senators questioned Ford and Kavanaugh themselves. During the coverage of the hearing, CBS News described Mitchell as "a career prosecutor with decades of experience prosecuting sex crimes".

Following the hearing, she issued a memorandum concluding a reasonable prosecutor would not file charges based on the evidence before the committee. The memo was criticized for drawing conclusions based on too little evidence.

On September 29, 2018 and October 6, 2018, Mitchell was portrayed by actress Aidy Bryant in the Saturday Night Live opening sketch, and referred to in the "Weekend Update" segment.

Acting County Attorney 
In August 2019, Montgomery promoted Mitchell to Chief Deputy at the county attorney's office. Mitchell got the job after Montgomery's longtime chief deputy Mark Faull left on medical leave and his replacement Michael McVey was accused of having an inappropriate relationship with another county employee. After Montgomery resigned to take a seat on the state supreme court, Mitchell became acting county attorney until the Maricopa County Board of Supervisors selected an interim to fill out the remainder of Montgomery's term. Mitchell, along with Jon Eliason, Allister Adel, Rodney Glassman, John Kaites, Gina Godbehere, Chris DeRose, and Lacy Cooper, applied for the position.

After the Board selected Adel for the County Attorney role,  Ken Vick became chief deputy and Mitchell became the deputy chief for the criminal group.

County Attorney 
Adel resigned in March 2022. The following month, the Maricopa County Board of Supervisors appointed Mitchell as the interim county attorney.

Mitchell was the Republican nominee in the 2022 special election defeating Anni Foster and Gina Godbehere for the nomination. 2020 nominee Julie Gunnigle was unopposed for the Democrat nomination. Mitchell defeated Gunnigle in the general election with 52.8% of the vote.

Recognition
Mitchell was named the prosecutor of the year by her office in 2006. Later in her career, she was recognized as the “Outstanding Arizona Sexual Assault Prosecutor of the Year” by Arizona Governor, Janet Napolitano and state attorney general Terry Goddard.

References

External links
 Appearances on C-Span.org
 Mitchell's memo to Republican members of the Senate Judiciary Committee, September 30, 2018, at Axios.com

1967 births
20th-century American lawyers
20th-century American women lawyers
21st-century American lawyers
21st-century American women lawyers
American prosecutors
American women academics
Arizona lawyers
Arizona Republicans
Arizona State University alumni
District attorneys in Arizona
Grand Canyon University alumni
Grand Canyon University faculty
Living people
People from Maricopa County, Arizona
Phoenix College alumni
Sexual assaults in the United States